Blackmill Loch is an impounding reservoir, in Argyll and Bute, Scotland. The loch was constructed in 1964 and is one source of freshwater for the Lochgair Hydroelectric Scheme. The loch feeds the River Add, when not diverted for hydroelectric purposes. It is one of the two significant forest lochs to the north of Loch Glashan, the other being Loch Bealach Ghearran.

See also
 List of lochs in Scotland
 List of reservoirs and dams in the United Kingdom

Sources
"Argyll and Bute Council Reservoirs Act 1975 Public Register"

Reservoirs in Argyll and Bute